Enough! Lebanon's Darkest Hour is a 2021 feature documentary film written and directed by Lebanese-Australian filmmaker Daizy Gedeon.

Synopsis 
Shot over four years and across four continents, the film documents Lebanon's descent into a state of turmoil over recent years. It covers the 2019 October Revolution and includes exclusive interviews with many key political leaders of the past four years, including prime minister Saad Hariri, former foreign minister Gebran Bassil, warlord Dr. Samir Geagea, Hezbollah minister Mohammad Fneich, former justice minister Salim Jreissati and governor of Lebanon's Central Bank, Riad Salame.

Awards 
The documentary won the Movie That Matters Award 2021 at a Better World Fund (BWF) gala in Cannes.

Distribution 
Exploration Films signed an agreement for the film in April 2022 and now manages exclusive distribution for the film in North America.

References

External links 
 

2021 films
2021 documentary films